Mann Manor is a national historic site located at 325 West Main Street, Bartow, Florida in Polk County.

It was added to the National Register of Historic Places on October 13, 2011.

References

National Register of Historic Places in Polk County, Florida
Buildings and structures in Bartow, Florida